The Fencing Competition at the 2005 Mediterranean Games was held in the Máximo Cuervo Sports Hall in Almería, Spain.

Medallists

Men's competition

Individual Epée

Individual Foil

Individual Sabre

Women's competition

Individual Epée

Individual Foil

Medal table

References
Results

M
Sports at the 2005 Mediterranean Games
 
International fencing competitions hosted by Spain